Billy Kipkorir Chemirmir (born December 8, 1972) is a Kenyan convicted murderer and suspected serial killer accused of the murders of elderly women in Dallas, Texas and its surrounding suburbs. As of June 2022, Chemirmir has been indicted for 22 murders. As of October 2022 he has been convicted of two of the murders. Civil suits have also been filed accusing him of a further six similar  murders.

Biography 
Billy Kipkorir Chemirmir was born in Kabonyony village, a Kenyan suburb of Eldama Ravine as the son of a long-serving village chief.

Chemirmir has convictions for driving under the influence in Addison and Dallas in 2010 and 2011, receiving fines and short custodial sentences. In July 2012, Chemirmir was arrested for assault on his then-girlfriend and in June 2016 for trespassing at Edgemere Retirement Community. He pleaded no contest to both charges later that year.

Accused crimes
Chemirmir is accused of posing as a medical professional or maintenance person and gaining access to the properties of at least twenty-two elderly women and smothering them with a pillow. Police in several North Texas communities are investigating Chemirmir for additional victims, believing that a number of previously-reported natural deaths may be linked to him.

Trial 
Chemirmir was arrested in March 2018, accused of smothering an 81-year-old woman to death. He was indicted on 11 additional counts of capital murder in May 2019. On February 7, 2020, trial was set for April 5, 2021. The trial was later delayed to November 12, 2021. Chemirmir's trial began November 15, 2021. On November 19, 2021, a judge declared a mistrial due to an 11–1 jury deadlock. Chemirmir's retrial began April 25, 2022. On April 28, 2022, Chemirmir was convicted in the murder of Lu Thi Harris and was sentenced to life in prison. Dallas County District Attorney John Creuzot told families in May 2021 that his office would not seek a death sentence for Chemirmir. However, Chemirmir could still face execution on pending capital murder charges in Collin County. His trial for the murder of Mary Brooks began on October 3, 2022. On October 7, 2022, Chemirmir was convicted in the murder of Mary Brooks and was sentenced to life in prison. After his convictions, the remaining charges against Chemirmir were dismissed which disappointed many of the other alleged victims families.

References 

1972 births
History of women in Texas
Kenyan expatriates in the United States
Kenyan nurses
Living people
People convicted of assault
People convicted of murder
People from Baringo County
Suspected serial killers